Pomichna is a city in Novoukrainka Raion, Kirovohrad Oblast (region) of Ukraine. It hosts the administration of Pomichna urban hromada, one of the hromadas of Ukraine. Population:

History 
In 1775, after the liquidation of Zaporozhian Sich, the Cossacks, leaving the Cossack winter quarters, settled in the slobodas, turning into peasants.

One of these liberties was the modern village of Pomichna. Near the fortress of St. Elizaveta was garrisoned by Zaporozhian Cossacks. The village of Pomichna provided the garrison with food, thereby providing help, "pomich", and hence the name of the settlement "Pomichna".

Former settlement in Kherson Governorate of the Russian Empire.

During World War II, the settlement was occupied by German troops. On March 18, 1944, Pomichna was liberated from the Nazi occupiers by the troops of the 2nd Ukrainian Front.

On May 14, 1967, by the Decree of the Presidium of the Verkhovna Rada of the Ukrainian SSR, Pomichna received the status of a city.

In 1989, population was 12322 people.

In 2013, population was 9210 people.

Until 18 July 2020, Pomichna belonged to Dobrovelychkivka Raion. The raion was abolished in July 2020, as part of the administrative reform of Ukraine, which reduced the number of raions of Kirovohrad Oblast to four. The area of Dobrovelychkivka Raion was merged into Novoukrainka Raion.

Climate

References

Cities in Kirovohrad Oblast
Cities of district significance in Ukraine
Kherson Governorate